This is a list of films produced by the Bollywood film industry in 2011.

Box office collection

January – March

April – June

July – September

October – December

See also
 List of Bollywood films of 2012
 List of Bollywood films of 2010

References

External links
 Bollywood films of 2011 at IMDB

2011
Lists of 2011 films by country or language
2011 in Indian cinema